Eliécer or Eliecer may refer to:

Ricardo Eliécer Neftalí Reyes Basoalto (1904–1973), known as Pablo Neruda, Chilean poet-diplomat and politician, won the Nobel Prize for Literature in 1971
Eliécer Cárdenas (1950–2021), Ecuadorian novelist
Eliecer Castillo (born 1970), Cuban professional boxer in the heavyweight division
Eliécer Silva Celis (1914–2007), Colombian anthropologist, archaeologist, professor and writer
Eliécer Ellis (born 1945), Panamanian former basketball player who competed in the 1968 Summer Olympics
Eliécer Espinosa (born 1996), Colombian footballer
Jorge Eliécer Gaitán (1903–1948), left-wing Colombian politician and charismatic leader of the Liberal Party
Jorge Eliécer Julio (born 1969), Colombian former professional boxer who competed from 1989 to 2003
Eliecer Navarro (born 1987), minor league baseball pitcher in the Pittsburgh Pirates organization
Eliecer Montes de Oca (born 1971), Cuban baseball player and Olympic gold medalist
Eliécer Pérez (born 1972), Cuban sport shooter

See also
Jorge Eliecer Gaitan Museum, museum in Bogota, Colombia
Eleazar
Eli Azur
Eliezer
Elizer
Elizur